The Laguna Palacios Formation is a Maastrichtian geologic formation of the Chubut Group in the Golfo San Jorge Basin in Patagonia, Argentina. The formation partly overlies and partly is laterally equivalent to the Lago Colhué Huapí Formation and is overlain by the Salamanca Formation of the Río Chico Group. The formation comprises tuff reworked by fluvial activity and paleosols. The Laguna Palacios Formation has provided fossilized bee nests. Dinosaur remains, such as Notoceratops, diagnostic to the genus level are among the fossils that have been recovered from the formation.

See also 
 List of dinosaur-bearing rock formations
 List of stratigraphic units with few dinosaur genera

References

Bibliography 
 
 
  

Geologic formations of Argentina
Upper Cretaceous Series of South America
Cretaceous Argentina
Tuff formations
Fluvial deposits
Ooliferous formations
Formations
Fossiliferous stratigraphic units of South America
Paleontology in Argentina
Geology of Patagonia
Geology of Chubut Province